Montenegro is a surname of Galician origin, later spreading to other parts of Spain and Portugal.

Approximately 8010 people in Spain share this surname, making it the 598th most common surname in the country.

Coat of arms
The main branches of the family have different coat of arms depending on the place of origin of the branch.
Galicia: Argent, an M sable
Asturias: Vert, an M argent crowned or
Portugal: Argent, a mountain sable with three peaks

Real people
Ariel Alfredo Montenegro (born 1975), Argentine footballer
Benito Jerónimo Feijóo e Montenegro (1676–1764), Galician monk and scholar
Brian Montenegro (born 1993), Paraguayan footballer
Conchita Montenegro (1911–2007), Spanish model, dancer, and actress
Daniel Montenegro (born 1979), Argentine footballer
Fernanda Montenegro (born 1929), Brazilian actress
Gloria Montenegro, botanist, biologist, and academic
Hugo Montenegro (1925–1981), American composer of film soundtracks
Jonathan Montenegro (born 1978), Venezuelan actor and singer, former member of Menudo
Jorge Montenegro (disambiguation), several individuals
Julio César Méndez Montenegro (1915–1996), president of Guatemala
Lisalla Montenegro, Brazilian fashion model
Markelda Montenegro de Herrera (born 1957), Panamanian politician
Orlando Montenegro Medrano (1920–1988), president of Nicaragua
Oswaldo Montenegro, Brazilian musician
Pierina Montenegro (born 1986), Uruguyan footballer
Pilar Montenegro (born 1972), Mexican singer
Raúl Montenegro (born 1949), Argentine biologist, environmentalist, and activist
Ricardo Montenegro (born 1949), Salvadoran politician and government minister
Roberto Montenegro (1887–1968), Mexican painter, illustrator, and stage designer
Sasha Montenegro (born 1946), Mexican actress of Montenegrin heritage
Soema Montenegro (born 1978), Argentine singer-songwriter
Valeen Montenegro (born 1986), Filipina actress and model

Fictional characters
Vaas Montenegro, character in the Far Cry video game series
Angela Montenegro, character in the television series Bones
Soraya Montenegro, character in the telenovela Maria de la Barrio

See also
Montenegro (disambiguation)

References

Italian-language surnames
Spanish-language surnames